The 1989 Matchroom League was a professional non-ranking snooker tournament that was played from January to May 1989.

Steve Davis topped the table and won the tournament. Cliff Thorburn recorded a maximum break in his match against Jimmy White. 


League phase

If points were level then match wins, followed by most frames won determined their positions. If two players had an identical record then the result in their match determined their positions. If that ended 4–4 then the player who got to four first was higher.

 17 January – The Iceland Hotel, Reykjavík
 Steve Davis 5–3 Neal Foulds
 January – Dolphin Centre, Darlington
 John Parrott 5–3 Terry Griffiths
 19 January – Queensway Hall, Dunstable
 Cliff Thorburn 5–3 Stephen Hendry
 20 January – Warwick University
 Willie Thorne 4–4 Jimmy White
 21 January – Torbay Lesuire Centre, Paignton
 Tony Meo 4–4 Cliff Thorburn, Thorburn replaced Higgins
 6 March –Spa Grand Hall, Scarborough
 Tony Meo 5–3 Terry Griffiths
 7 March – Grantham
 John Parrott 5–3 Willie Thorne
 8 March – Hawth Theatre, Crawley
 Cliff Thorburn 7–1 Jimmy White
 9 March – Watford Leisure Centre, Watford
 John Parrott 5–3 Neal Foulds
 10 March – Aston Villa Sports and Leisure Centre, Birmingham
 Jimmy White 5–3 Alex Higgins
 11 March – Central Hall, York
 Jimmy White 5–3 Terry Griffiths
 12 March – The Dome, Kelham Hall, Newark
 Neal Foulds 4–4 Willie Thorne
 12 March – Greenhills Sports Centre, Drogheda
 Cliff Thorburn 5–3 Alex Higgins
 13 March – Civic Theatre, Barnsley
 John Parrott 6–2 Tony Meo
 14 March – Swansea Leisure Centre, Swansea
 Steve Davis 6–2 Tony Meo
 15 March – Merthyr Tydfil
 Willie Thorne 5–3 Terry Griffiths
 16 March – Hereford Leisure Centre, Hereford
 Neal Foulds 4–4 Stephen Hendry
 18 March – Perdiswell Sports Centre, Worcester
 Steve Davis 7–1 Willie Thorne
 19 March – Fairfield Halls, Croydon
 Stephen Hendry 5–3 John Parrott
 19 March – Ostend
 Neal Foulds 7–1 Jimmy White
 23 March – Dundonald Ice Bowl, Dundonald
 Willie Thorne 5–3 Alex Higgins
 25 March – Sands Centre, Carlisle
 Steve Davis 5–3 Stephen Hendry
 27 March – Crowtree Leisure Centre, Sunderland
 Steve Davis 6–2 Cliff Thorburn
 27 March – Amsterdam
 Stephen Hendry 5–3 Tony Meo
 4 April – North Bridge Leisure Centre, Halifax
 Tony Meo 5–3 Jimmy White
 5 April – Howebridge Leisure Centre, Wigan
 Steve Davis 5–3 John Parrott
 6 April – Thornaby Pavilion, Thornaby-on-Tees
 Neal Foulds 5–3 Alex Higgins
 7 April – Mansfield Leisure Centre, Mansfield
 John Parrott 7–1 Alex Higgins
 7 April – Finland
 Terry Griffiths 5–3 Cliff Thorburn
 8 April – New Victoria Theatre, Newcastle-under-Lyme
 Stephen Hendry 5–3 Willie Thorne
 9 April – Harrogate International Centre, Harrogate
 Stephen Hendry 5–3 Alex Higgins
 9 April – Monte Carlo
 Steve Davis 7–1 Terry Griffiths
 10 April – Municipal Hall, Colne
 Cliff Thorburn 5–3 Neal Foulds
 4 May – Northcroft Recreation Centre, Newbury
 Alex Higgins 4–4 Tony Meo
 5 May – Bath Sports and Leisure centre, Bath
 John Parrott 4–4 Jimmy White
 6 May – Granby Halls Leisure Centre, Leicester
 Stephen Hendry 6–2 Jimmy White
 6 May – Germany
 Tony Meo 4–4 Willie Thorne
 7 May – Towngate Theatre, Poole Arts Centre, Poole
 Stephen Hendry 6–2 Terry Griffiths
 8 May – St David's Hall, Cardiff
 Terry Griffiths 5–3 Alex Higgins
 9 May – Meadowside Centre, Burton upon Trent 
 Cliff Thorburn 5–3 Willie Thorne
 11 May – Royal Centre, Nottingham
 Steve Davis 5–3 Alex Higgins
 13 May – Norwich Sports Village, Norwich
 Terry Griffiths 6–2 Neal Foulds
 13 May – Marseille
 John Parrott 7–1 Cliff Thorburn
 14 May – Brentwood International Centre, Brentwood
 Jimmy White 6–2 Steve Davis
 Unknown date and venue
 Neal Foulds 4–4 Tony Meo

References

Premier League Snooker
1989 in snooker
1989 in British sport